Lake Dive is located in the south east of the Egmont National Park at a height of 907 m above sea level. It was discovered in 1887 by Bradshaw Dive on his descent from the summit when he saw what he believed to be a lake. A party led by Thomas Dawson later confirmed that it was indeed a lake. In April 1964 the Lake Dive Hut was opened a short distance from the lake.

References 

 EGMONT NATIONAL PARK handbook 1970 published by the Egmont National Park Board, New Plymouth

Dive
South Taranaki District